Gerhard Westerburg (c. 1490 in Cologne – 1558 in Dykhausen, Sande, Lower Saxony) was a German jurist and Anabaptist theologian. He published various pamphlets related to the Reformation in Cologne.

References

German Anabaptists
Year of birth uncertain
1558 deaths